Statistics of Premier League of Bosnia and Herzegovina in the 2001–02 season.  It was contested by Bosniak and Croatian clubs.  Serbian clubs played in the 2001–02 First League of the Republika Srpska.

Overview
It was contested by 16 teams, and FK Željezničar Sarajevo won the championship.

Clubs and stadiums

League standings

Results

References
Bosnia-Herzegovina - List of final tables (RSSSF)

See also
2001–02 First League of the Republika Srpska

Premier League of Bosnia and Herzegovina seasons
1
Bosnia